The English Short-faced Tumbler is a breed of fancy pigeon developed over many years of selective breeding. English Short-faced Tumblers along with other varieties of domesticated pigeons are all descendants of the rock dove (Columba livia). The English Short-faced Tumbler is one of the oldest breeds referred to in John Moore's book  Columbarium: or, The pigeon-house; being an introduction to a natural history of tame pigeons, giving an account of the several species known in England, with the method of breeding them, their distempers and cures (London: J. Wilford, 1735).

See also 

List of pigeon breeds

References

Pigeon breeds
Pigeon breeds originating in England